Stenanthemum centrale is a species of flowering plant in the family Rhamnaceae and is endemic to the Northern Territory of Australia. It is a woody shrub with egg-shaped leaves, the narrower end towards the base and dense, yellowish heads of 10 to 40 tube-shaped flowers, sometimes with whitish floral leaves.

Description
Both surfaces of the leaves are densely covered with shaggy, greyish, star-shaped hairs.

Taxonomy and naming
Stenanthemum centrale was first formally described in 2007 by Kevin Thiele in the Journal of the Adelaide Botanic Gardens from specimens collected in 1995 by David Albrecht in Finke Gorge National Park. The specific epithet (centrale) means "central point", referring to distribution of the species, in Central Australia.

Distribution and habitat
This species occurs in the Finke Gorge National Park and Owen Springs Reserve in the MacDonnell Ranges of the Northern Territory, where it grows on slopes and ridges and in rocky gorges.

References

centrale
Rosales of Australia
Flora of the Northern Territory
Plants described in 2007
Taxa named by Kevin Thiele